Tears Flooding the Autumnal Fields (also known as Tear Drops On the Harvest Land) is an oil painting completed in 1976 by the Chinese artist Chen Danqing. It depicts Tibetans crying as they listen to the news of Mao Zedong’s death on the radio in harvest of a wheat field.

References

1976 paintings
Chinese paintings